Marian Zeciu (born 25 February 1977 in Bucharest, Romania) is a retired Armenian footballer of Romanian background, who played as a defender. Zeciu was a member of Armenia national football team, participating in 7 international matches.

Honours

Club
Pyunik Yerevan
 Armenian Premier League: 2003, 2004
 Armenian Cup: 2004

National team statistics

External links

1977 births
Living people
Armenian footballers
Armenian expatriate footballers
Armenia international footballers
Armenian people of Romanian descent
Romanian footballers
Romanian expatriate footballers
ASC Daco-Getica București players
FC Pyunik players
ASC Oțelul Galați players
AS Voința Snagov players
CSM Ceahlăul Piatra Neamț players
Liga I players
Liga II players
Naturalized citizens of Armenia
Armenian Premier League players
Footballers from Bucharest
Association football defenders
Association football midfielders